The 1995 Brickyard 400, the 2nd running of the event, was a NASCAR Winston Cup Series race held on August 5, 1995. It was the 19th race of the 1995 NASCAR Winston Cup Series. The race, contested over 160 laps, was won by Dale Earnhardt driving for Richard Childress. Rusty Wallace driving for Roger Penske finished second and Dale Jarrett driving for Robert Yates finished third.

The popular event returned for a second year, after the tremendous success of the first running. The weekend was expanded by the addition of practice on Wednesday afternoon.

Report

Background 
Indianapolis Motor Speedway is one of six superspeedways to hold NASCAR races, the others being Michigan International Speedway, Auto Club Speedway, Daytona International Speedway, Pocono Raceway and Talladega Superspeedway. The track's turns are banked at 9 degrees, while the front stretch, the location of the finish line, has no banking. The back stretch, opposite of the front, also has none. The racetrack has seats for 250,000 spectators.

Before the race, Jeff Gordon led the Drivers' Championship with 2,705 points, with Sterling Marlin in second and Dale Earnhardt in third. Mark Martin and Ted Musgrave filled the next two positions, with Morgan Shepherd, Rusty Wallace, Michael Waltrip, Terry Labonte and Bill Elliott rounded out the top ten. Gordon was the race's defending champion.

Pole qualifying 
Defending champion Gordon won the pole position on Thursday August 3 with a track record speed of 172.536 mph. A hot day saw most speeds down, and Gordon was the only driver to break the existing track record. Bobby Hamilton put the fans on their feet when he put the popular Petty #43 Pontiac car on the outside of the front row with a run of 172.222 mph.

Second round qualifying 
On Friday August 4, the remnants of Hurricane Erin overtook the midwest, and rain settled in for two days. Friday morning practice was lost, and second round qualifying was also rained out. As a result, all cars reverted to their time trials speed from the first round, and the field was filled accordingly. Without a chance in second round qualifying, A. J. Foyt notably failed to qualify, the first time he failed to qualify in a race he attempted at the Indianapolis Motor Speedway since 1958. The field managed a brief "happy hour" practice late Friday evening, and rain began to fall again.

Race 

On Saturday August 5, steady rain fell all morning, and threatened to wash out the day. The forecast was marginal for Sunday as well, threatening to wash out the whole weekend. Many fans left the grounds as local media speculated (and some erroneously reported) that the race would be postponed. In an unexpected turn of events, at approximately 3:30 p.m. EST (4:30 p.m. EDT), the skies suddenly cleared, and track drying efforts began in earnest. The teams scrambled to get their cars prepared, and the field hastily lined up in the garage area. The Chevrolet C/K pace truck led them on to the track and the race began with many fans still scurrying to their seats. Many of the pit crews were also scrambling to get their equipment set up in the pit area. Some fans driving home on the interstate reportedly turned around and drove back to the track when the radio reported the race was starting.

The green flag dropped at 4:25 p.m. EST (5:25 p.m. EDT) with live coverage only on the radio. ABC-TV had already signed off and by then had decided to air the race on ESPN on tape delay on Sunday afternoon. It stands as one of the last NASCAR races not aired live on television (the 1996 DieHard 500 at Talladega, a CBS race, had its broadcast delayed a week, airing after the Brickyard 400, and the 2000 second-tier series Coca-Cola 300 at Texas Motor Speedway, also a CBS race, had its broadcast cancelled, a ploy by MTV Networks). ABC's decision prompted angry phone calls from their affiliate TV stations in North Carolina.

Because of the rain earlier in the day, the starting grid was assembled in the garage area rather than along pit lane or frontstretch as normal. After the command to start engines, the field emerged from behind the pit road grandstands near turn one to begin their pace laps. While this was the only time such a situation occurred, it nevertheless provided for an impromptu, yet dramatic entrance of the cars onto the race track.

Dale Earnhardt beat Rusty Wallace to the finish line, in a race slowed by only one caution for four laps. Jeff Burton spun off turn two right in front of eventual winner Earnhardt with 27 laps to go. The race was completed at 7:03 p.m. EST (8:03 p.m. EDT), shortly before sunset. It was the latest cars had ever raced at Indianapolis until the 2017 Brickyard 400, which ended at 8:57 p.m. EDT (Indiana had begun daylight saving time observation by the time).

Race results 

Failed to qualify
 44-Jeff Purvis
 95-Loy Allen Jr.
 66-Billy Standridge
 78-Pancho Carter
 71-Dave Marcis
 65-Steve Seligman
 50-A. J. Foyt
 80-Joe Ruttman
 99-Danny Sullivan
 Danny Sullivan's entry was withdrawn after his career-ending crash in the Marlboro 500 at Michigan.

References 

Brickyard 400
Brickyard 400
NASCAR races at Indianapolis Motor Speedway